Dock9 (Dedicator of cytokinesis 9), also known as Zizimin1, is a large (~230 kDa) protein involved in intracellular signalling networks. It is a member of the DOCK-D subfamily of the DOCK family of guanine nucleotide exchange factors that function as activators of small G proteins. Dock9 activates the small G protein Cdc42.

Discovery
Dock9 was discovered using an affinity proteomic approach designed to identify novel activators of the small G protein Cdc42 in fibroblasts. Subsequent northern blot analysis revealed that Dock9 is expressed primarily in the brain, heart, skeletal muscle, kidney, placenta and lung. Lower levels were detected in the colon, thymus, liver, small intestine and in leukocytes from peripheral blood.

Structure and function
Dock9 shares a similar structure of two core domains (known as DHR1 and DHR2), which are shared by all DOCK family members. The C-terminal DHR2 domain functions as an atypical GEF domain for small G proteins (see Dock180: structure and function) and the DHR1 domain is known, in some DOCK-A/B/C subfamily proteins, to be involved in their recruitment to the plasma membrane. Unlike DOCK-A/B/C proteins DOCK-D proteins (including Dock9) contain an N-terminal pleckstrin homology (PH) domain that mediates their recruitment to the membrane. Dock9, along with other DOCK-C/D subfamily members, can activate Cdc42 in vitro and in vivo via its DHR2 domain. However, Dock9 adopts an autoinhibitory conformation that masks the DHR2 domain in its resting state. The mechanism by which this autoinhibition is overcome is still unclear although in some other DOCK proteins, which also undergo autoinhibition, it requires an interaction with adaptor proteins such as ELMO. Dock9 has also been reported to dimerise, under resting conditions, via its DHR2 domains and this study suggests that other DOCK family proteins may also behave in the same way. Recent analysis of a chromosomal region associated with susceptibility to bipolar disorder revealed that single nucleotide polymorphisms in the DOCK9 gene contribute to the risk and severity of this condition.

References

Further reading

Biology of bipolar disorder